Simisola is the eponymous second studio album by Nigerian singer Simi. It was released on September 8, 2017, by X3M Music. The album is the follow-up to her debut album, Ogaju (2008). Simisola received positive reviews from music critics, who praised the creativity and versatility of Simi's exploration of different sounds. The album was supported by five singles: "Tiff", "Jamb Question", "Love Don't Care", "Smile for Me" and "Joromi". Its production was handled by Sess, Seyi Keyz, Oscar and Vtek. Upon its release, the album debuted at number five on the Billboard World Albums chart for the week of September 30, 2017. Simisola won Album of the Year and was nominated for Best R&B/Pop album at The Headies 2018. Moreover, it was nominated for Album of the Year the 2018 Nigeria Entertainment Awards.

Promotion
Simi released the Oscar-produced love song "Smile for Me" on January 27, 2017. Its music video was directed by Clarence Peters. In anticipation of the album, she released another Oscar-produced love song called "Joromi". Its music video was directed by Aje Films. On September 1, she took to Instagram to unveil the album's cover art and track listing.

Composition
Known for composing love ballads, the album sees Simi combining contemporary R&B with highlife and juju music. "Joromi" is inspired by Victor Uwaifo, while "Aimasiko" is a remake of Ebenezer Obey's "Aimasiko". Elements of Afrobeats, dancehall and techno can be found in "Original Baby", "Hip Hop Hurray" and "One Kain", respectively.

Singles
"Tiff", "Jamb Question" and "Love Don't Care" all appeared as bonus tracks on the album. "Tiff" was nominated for Best RnB Video and Music Video of the Year at the 2015 Nigerian Music Video Awards. "Jamb Question" was also nominated for Best Soft Rock/Alternative Video at the aforementioned awards ceremony. "Love Don't Care" was released on February 14, 2016, in celebration of Valentine's Day; it was nominated in three categories at The Headies 2016, winning one.

Critical reception

Simisola received positive reviews from music critics, who were pleased with Simi's progress and versatility in exploring several music genres. Ifeoluwa Nihinlola of Music in Africa opined that Simi has progressed since her last album and thinks "she has found a way to retain the lightness of her voice and persona, while being earnest, all without turning bathetic". Filter Free's Chiagoziem Onyekwena stated: "On Simisola, Simi defines her own sense of everything." An editor for YNaija was full of praise for Simi's dynamism in fusing two Nigerian classics with contemporary R&B, and further added that the album is "a project that could go on to start a new Nigerian sound".

Vibe's Cyclone Artemis, who wrote a song by song review, pointed out that the "deep chemistry" between Oscar and Simi makes the album "in a class of its own by quite a number of standards". Reviewing for Pulse Nigeria, Joey Akan observed that Simi "delivered on her promise of good music" and went on to argue that "in many ways, it is the best that Nigeria has seen in 2017". Adeyemi Gbolahan of TalkGlitz Media added, "the album didn’t contain sounds like most Nigerian body of works that boasts of the ‘pon pon’ sounds." Describing the album as "quite predictable", Adeoluwa Atayero of Nigerian Entertainment Today wrote a mixed review. However, he remarked that Simisola is "one of the strongest musical pieces of 2017 and without a doubt a step in the right direction".

Accolades

Track listing
Credits adapted from the album's official liner notes.

Personnel

 Simi – primary artist 
 Adekunle Gold – featured artist 
 Fiokee – live guitars
 Alaba – live percussion
 Dami – live sax
 Ayo – live bass
 Obi Somto
 Simi - mixing
 Vtek – mastering
 Oscar – production 
 SeyiKeyz - production 
 Sess - production 
 Vtek - production

Release history

References
 

2017 albums
Simi (singer) albums
Albums produced by Sess
Albums produced by Vtek
Albums produced by Oscar (record producer)